Joan Wennstrom Bennett (born September 15, 1942) is a fungal geneticist who also is active in issues concerning women in science.  Educated at Upsala College (B.S. 1963) and the University of Chicago (M.S. 1964, Ph.D. 1967), she was on the faculty of Tulane University for 35 years. She is a past president of the American Society for Microbiology (1990-1991) and of the Society for Industrial Microbiology and Biotechnology (2001-2002), and past Editor in Chief of Mycologia (2000-2004).  She was elected to the National Academy of Sciences in 2005.

While at Tulane University, Bennett was on the committee that established the first women's center at Newcomb College (the women's college at Tulane) and taught a popular course on the biology of women beginning in 1975.  After Professor Bennett joined the Rutgers faculty, she was appointed Associate Vice President to establish an Office for the Promotion of Women in Science, Engineering & Mathematics  which promotes gender and racial equity in the sciences, mathematics, and engineering.

Professor Bennett was the first tenure track woman hired on the faculty of the Biology Department at Tulane University.  While there, Dr. Bennett and her laboratory established a research program on the genetics and biosynthesis of aflatoxin in collaboration with scientists at the Southern Regional Research Center, a branch of the United States Department of Agriculture in New Orleans, Louisiana.  This research provided a useful model for other polyketide secondary metabolites and expanded the possibilities for reducing these poisons in foods and the environment.  After Hurricane Katrina, Professor Bennett moved to Rutgers University where she currently is a Professor II in the Department of Plant Biology and Pathology.  Her Rutgers laboratory has pioneered the use of genetic model systems for elucidating the physiological effects of fungal volatile organic compounds.

Bennett is married to David Lorenz Peterson, a computer systems consultant.  She is the mother of three sons: John Frank Bennett, Daniel Edgerton Bennett and Mark Bradford Bennett.

Awards
 1990 - Honorary Doctor of Literature, Upsala College
 2001 - Carski Teaching Award, American Society for Microbiology
 2003 - Charles Porter Award, Society for Industrial Microbiology & Biotechnology
 2005 - National Academy of Sciences
 2005 - Honorary Doctor of Science, Bethany College (West Virginia)
 2006 - Alice C. Evans Award, American Society for Microbiology
 2007 - Honorary Professor, Institute of Microbiology, Chinese Academy of Sciences

References

1942 births
American mycologists
Rutgers University faculty
Living people
Upsala College alumni
University of Chicago alumni
Tulane University faculty
Members of the United States National Academy of Sciences
American geneticists
Academic journal editors
American women geneticists
21st-century American women scientists
21st-century American biologists
20th-century American women scientists
20th-century American biologists
Women mycologists